The 2013 Missouri Valley Conference men's basketball tournament, popularly referred to as "Arch Madness", as part of the 2012-13 NCAA Division I men's basketball season was played in St. Louis, Missouri March 7–10, 2013 at the Scottrade Center. The championship game was televised on CBS on Sunday March 10. The tournament's winner received the Missouri Valley Conference's automatic bid to the 2013 NCAA tournament.

Tournament Bracket

All times listed are Central

References 

-
Missouri Valley Conference men's basketball tournament